Fotis Lagos (born 10 May 1971) is a retired Greek football defender.

References

1971 births
Living people
Chaidari F.C. players
Levadiakos F.C. players
Ethnikos Asteras F.C. players
Super League Greece players
Association football defenders
Footballers from Athens
Greek footballers